Mijatović is a patronymic surname derived from the masculine given name Mijat. Notable people with this surname include:

Aleksandar Mijatović (born 1982), Serbian footballer
Andre Mijatović (born 1979), Croatian footballer
Cvijetin Mijatović (1913–1992), Yugoslav politician
Čedomilj Mijatović 1842–1932), Serbian politician
Dario Mijatović (born 1984), Croatian footballer
Dunja Mijatović (born 1964), Bosnian media and free speech regulator
Elodie Lawton Mijatović (1825–1908), British author
Mario Mijatović (born 1980), Croatian footballer
Nenad Mijatović (born 1987), Montenegrin basketball player
Predrag Mijatović (born 1969), Montenegrin footballer
Rade Mijatović (born 1981), Montenegrin handball player
Bojan Mijatović (born 1983), Spanish Marketing & Communications Director

Croatian surnames
Serbian surnames
Patronymic surnames